The 2016 Women's Junior Pan-Am Championship was the 8th edition of the Women's Pan American Junior Championship. It was held from 31 March to 9 April 2016 in Tacarigua, Trinidad and Tobago.

The tournament served as a qualifier for the 2016 Women's Hockey Junior World Cup, held in Santiago, Chile in November/December 2016.

Argentina won the tournament for the 7th time, defeating the United States 6–0 in the final. Chile won the bronze medal by defeating Canada 3–0 in the third and fourth place playoff.

Participating nations
Alongside the host nation, 7 teams competed in the tournament.

Results

First round

Pool A

Pool B

Second round

Quarterfinals

Fifth to eighth place classification

Crossover

Seventh and eighth place

Fifth and sixth place

First to fourth place classification

Semi-finals

Third and fourth place

Final

Statistics

Final standings

Awards

Goalscorers

References

Women's Pan-Am Junior Championship
Pan-Am Junior Championship
International women's field hockey competitions hosted by Trinidad and Tobago
Pan-Am Junior Championship Women
Pan American Junior Championship
Pan American Junior Championship
Pan American Championship
Pan American Championship